Stewart Low was a Scottish professional footballer who played as a centre half in the Scottish League for Montrose and Lochgelly United.

Career statistics

References

Scottish footballers
Brentford F.C. players
Scottish Football League players
Year of birth missing
Year of death missing
Place of birth missing
Place of death missing
Association football wing halves
Lochgelly United F.C. players
Montrose F.C. players